Elizabeth Brontë (/ˈbrɒnti/, commonly /ˈbrɒnteɪ/; 8 February 1815 – 15 June 1825) was the second-eldest child of Patrick Brontë and Maria Brontë, née Branwell. A member of the literary Brontë family, Elizabeth was the younger sister of Maria Brontë as well as the elder sister of writers Charlotte, Emily and Anne, and poet and artist Branwell. Less is known about Elizabeth than all the other members of her family.

Early life

Elizabeth Brontë was born on 8 February in 1815 and was named after her maternal aunt, as was customary at the time. She was only a few months old when she and her family, along with her aunt and namesake Elizabeth Branwell, moved from Hartshead to Thornton, where her baptism took place. Elizabeth was baptised on 26 August 1815 by J. Fennell, an officiating Minister at the Parish of Thornton and Chapelry of Thornton. Elizabeth’s godmother was chosen to be Elizabeth Firth, one of the Brontës' new friends in Thornton. By 1820, Patrick and Maria Brontë had had four more children during their years in Thornton and they decided to move again to Haworth where Patrick would become a pastor at the Church of St Michael and All Angels and would live with his family at the adjoining parsonage.

 However, in 1821, Mrs. Brontë passed away – this led her sister, Elizabeth Branwell, to move into the Parsonage to look after the children. A servant of the Brontë family, Nancy Garrs, recalled how the young Elizabeth would lead her younger sisters by their hands on their walks across the Yorkshire moors, stating that she was ‘very thoughtful’ in her treatment of them. When Patrick Brontë asked Elizabeth what the best mode of education was for a woman, she responded “that which would make her rule the house well”.

Education
In 1823, Elizabeth and her elder sister Maria were sent to Crofton Hall, a fashionable boarding school in Yorkshire. However, the school’s fees soon proved to be too high for Patrick, who also wished his three younger daughters to receive a formal education. Therefore, Maria and Elizabeth joined Cowan Bridge School, a newly opened boarding school for daughters of the clergy in Lancashire in July 1824 which was funded by, among others, William Wilberforce. The school would later be immortalised in fiction as Lowood School in Jane Eyre. The director and founder of Cowan Bridge, Reverend William Carus Wilson, was a clergyman who was said to have been looked up to by Patrick Brontë. Maria and Elizabeth were followed by Charlotte and Emily two months later. There was a distinctive lack of sanitation in the school: the food provided by the school was often poorly cooked and unhealthy, and the cook was reported as being "careless, dirty, and wasteful". Both Maria and Elizabeth had recently recovered from measles and whooping cough, and they often could not eat despite the fact that they were hungry.

Elizabeth was not generally described as academic and instead was described as a practical girl with 'sound common sense' by her father; while school records showed that Maria, Charlotte and Emily were to be trained to be governesses, Elizabeth's future occupation was listed as a 'housekeeper'. Perhaps owing to this, Patrick did not pay an extra £3 a year so that Elizabeth might learn French, music and drawing, as he did with his other three daughters.

Illness and death
 
In February 1825, Maria was diagnosed with tuberculosis and was transported back home. Possibly encouraged by bad conditions, in the early spring of that same year there was an outbreak of typhus in the school. There is a possibility that this may have covered up symptoms of tuberculosis in Elizabeth. Over the following six months one girl was to die at school and 20 more were withdrawn ill with six dying soon afterwards. Elizabeth was sent home ill on 31 May, by which time Maria had already died. A few days later, Charlotte and Emily were brought home in good health and none of the family were ever to return to Cowan Bridge School. Elizabeth died of her illness on 15 June in 1825, with her school record stating she died of consumption. Her loss affected her family deeply and her other sisters and brother were to follow, leaving her father without any grandchildren. Elizabeth was buried in the Brontë vault at the Church of St Michael and All Angels. On her tombstone is enscribed the following message taken from Matthew 18:3:

See also
 Brontë Parsonage Museum, parsonage previously owned by the Brontës which has been converted into a museum presenting their lives
 Arthur Bell Nicholls, husband of Charlotte Brontë
 Elizabeth Gaskell, good friend of Charlotte Brontë

References

Works cited
 

 

1815 births
1825 deaths
Brontë family